Ataxia hubbardi is a species of beetle in the family Cerambycidae. It was described by Warren Samuel Fisher in 1924. It is known from the United States and Mexico.

References

Ataxia (beetle)
Beetles described in 1924